Turgut Demirağ (13 December 1921 – 14 January 1987) was a Turkish film producer, director and screenwriter. He directed 16 films between 1947 and 1973. His 1964 film Love and Grudge was entered into the 4th Moscow International Film Festival.

Selected filmography
 Love and Grudge (1964)

References

External links

1921 births
1987 deaths
Turkish film producers
Turkish film directors
Turkish male screenwriters
People from Sivas
20th-century Turkish screenwriters